Joseph Albert Taylor Sullivan (January 8, 1901 – September 30, 1988) was a Canadian Olympic ice hockey player, physician, surgeon, and Canadian senator.

Born in Toronto, Ontario, he graduated from the University of Toronto Schools. In 1926, he earned his medical degree from the University of Toronto Faculty of Medicine. While studying, he was the goaltender for the Toronto Varsity Blues hockey team. A team of graduates from the Blues represented Canada at the 1928 Winter Olympics in St. Moritz, where the team won the Gold Medal, with Sullivan not allowing a goal in the three-game round-robin. His brother, Frank, was also on the team.

In 1930, he started his medical practice, specializing in otolaryngology. During World War II, he served as a consultant in otolaryngology with the honorary rank of wing commander in the Royal Canadian Air Force. After the war, he became an associate professor at the University of Toronto.

One of his patients was the Prime Minister of Canada, John Diefenbaker. In 1957, he was appointed to the Senate of Canada by Diefenbaker, representing the senatorial division of North York, Ontario. A Progressive Conservative, he resigned in 1985.

Sullivan enjoyed his summers for many years on Lake Temagami, north of North Bay, Ontario.

In 1988, he was inducted into the University of Toronto Sports Hall of Fame. The Senator Joseph A. Sullivan Trophy, named in his honour, is presented annually to the outstanding hockey player in Canadian Interuniversity Sport. A Roman Catholic, Sullivan was a papal Knight of the Order of the Holy Sepulchre and a papal Knight Commander of Order of St. Gregory the Great with distinction.

References

External links

1901 births
1988 deaths
Canadian ice hockey goaltenders
Canadian otolaryngologists
Canadian senators from Ontario
Progressive Conservative Party of Canada senators
Ice hockey players at the 1928 Winter Olympics
Olympic gold medalists for Canada
Olympic ice hockey players of Canada
Politicians from Toronto
Ice hockey people from Toronto
University of Toronto alumni
Academic staff of the University of Toronto
Toronto Varsity Blues ice hockey players
Olympic medalists in ice hockey
Medalists at the 1928 Winter Olympics
Royal Canadian Air Force personnel of World War II
Canadian Roman Catholics
Knights Commander of the Order of St Gregory the Great
Knights of the Holy Sepulchre
Canadian sportsperson-politicians